"Learning to Live (Without Your Love)" is a song by English singer Rick Astley and English singer O'Chi Brown. The song was originally released in 1986 as an album track on Brown's album O'Chi. Astley was uncredited on the album and received no royalties.

When Rick Astley achieved worldwide success with his 1987 debut single "Never Gonna Give You Up", Magnetic Records released the song as a single in October 1987 to cash-in on his success. The song however failed to chart in the UK Singles Chart. The B-side, "Another Broken Heart", is a Brown solo track. The two singers never met, and Brown first heard Astley's vocal when she was given a copy of her album.

Track listing
"Learning to Live (Without Your Love)"
 7" – 3.29
 12" – 4.50
"Another Broken Heart"
 7" – 3.36
 Remix – 6.05
 Album Version – 5.46

References

External links
Non album tracks in Rickastley.co.uk

1986 songs
1987 singles
Rick Astley songs
Songs written by Pete Waterman
Songs written by Matt Aitken
Songs written by Mike Stock (musician)
Song recordings produced by Stock Aitken Waterman